Press Play is a Christian pop and rock band formed by worship leader Dave Hanley in 2008. The lead singers of the band include Dave Hanley, Nicole Croteau and Jonathan Thulin. They are the former worship team for the Los Angeles Dream Center, the church where the band also was formed. Press Play is now traveling full time around the world. They are currently signed to Dream Records with distribution through EMI Christian Music Group. They have released four albums to date: Life Is Beautiful (2009), NY2LA (2010), World Anthem (2011), and LITO (2013).

Band history

Dave Hanley, while leading worship at the Dream Center's Angelus Temple, had a vision to create relevant worship that would reach not only within Christian walls but outside into the community. In the earlier years, before the name "Press Play" was born, the team went under the name Dream House. There they began to create a new sound that peaked loads of interest in the L.A area. After a few Dream House albums had been released the band began to go by the name "Press Play" and in 2008 they caught the eye of Universal Record's A&R executive Rhoda Lawrence, she signed them immediately after hearing them. Dave then started a new record label called Dream Records which became an imprint of Universal.

Press Play's first major release was Life is Beautiful which featured the then lead female vocalist Paige Adkins, who is the daughter of comedian Sinbad. The album also featured guest vocals from Darlene Zschech of Hillsong. Upon the band's debut release through its new partnership with Universal Records, Life Is Beautiful reached No. 2 on Billboards Christian Albums chart and  No. 45 on the Billboard 200 chart. Press Play performed on NBC's Today Show, meeting with ABC, appearing on Fox News and with features in national newspapers, magazines and on numerous national TV outlets. Press Play also worked with producer Rodney Jerkins at the time.

The band quickly began work on a new album that would release only a year later. Paige Adkins was replaced by a new female lead, Sada K. Jackson. They dubbed the new album NY2LA. The album reached No. 3 on the Billboard Christian Albums chart, moving slightly down from its predecessor. The first single released from the album was the title track, which featured guest rapper Tyler James Williams from Everybody Hates Chris. The single peaked at No. 20 on the Christian CHR chart. Christian CHR station Air1 released the music video for "NY2LA".

In late 2010, Press Play decided to part ways with Dream Center and head out on the road full time. A majority of the band stayed behind to continue leading worship which led to almost an entirely new band, though Dave and Sada remained. Drummer Mike Adams and singer and keyboard player Jonathan Thulin joined. Thulin was travelling as a solo artist at the time and signed to Dream shortly after joining the group. His album The Anatomy of a Heartflow was released on September 13, 2011. After a short hiatus, Press Play went out on a six-week tour with openers Rachael Lampa, Charmaine and Ryan Stevenson early in 2011. Singing in churches around the US, Press Play once again became inspired to start writing a new album, World Anthem, which was written and recorded in 11 days with the whole team contributing, including David Thulin, the brother of Jonathan Thulin and the one responsible for the majority of the beats and sequencing on the album. On the new album, Press Play went for a bit of a new sound by adding Jonathan as another one of the lead vocalists, using three very different voices to create one defined dance sound. The album released on September 27, 2011 on Dream/Universal Records. The album also features vocals from Manwell Reyes of Group 1 Crew and Mark Marques of Shake the Nation. Three members were added: bass player Sean Cook, vocalist Nicole Croteau, and lead guitar Michael Baja were added.

Discography

Albums

Singles

References 
 Wiegman, Ken (May, 2009) AlphaOmegaNews. Retrieved 2009-05-09
 Fryberger, Scott (Aug, 2010) JesusFreakHideout. Retrieved 2010-08-10
  Hansen, Brant (June, 2009) Air1. Retrieved 2009-06-08
 Wright, Jay (Aug, 2011) ChristianMusicReview. Retrieved 2011-08-29

External links 
 [ Billboard artist profile]

Christian musical groups
Christian hip hop groups
Musical groups established in 2008